PinupFiles is a paid subscription Internet pornography website featuring mainly large breasted women. The companies slogan is "Classically inspired busty pinup girls."

It is available in four languages.

History 
Pinup Files was launched in 1998 as an image database for pin-up models. In the beginning they uploaded images of well known models from the 1950s, 60s and 70s. In 2003 the website switched focus to large breast models as they continued to feature pin-up models from the 1990s. Beginning in 2005 the website began publishing their own new content. By late 2005 the website's popularity skyrocketed because of the hundreds of hours of top-less videos of well known models including a handful of notable Playboy Playmates.

The website's notability continued to grow in the 2010s as the age of internet pornography surged. From 2010 until 2015 users jumped by 75% and total page views by 150%. This growth can be contributed to the site's intensive upgrades during this time. Developers made the site easier to navigate and fixed bugs including a crashing bug that plagued the site due to its exponential growth.

Additional ventures

Pinup Dollars 
Pinup Dollars was founded by Pinup Files in 2009 and is an affiliate program of websites. It offers two services Revenue sharing and web referral. They also offer full website building and maintenance for clients as of March 2020 five pinup girls have Pinup Dollar websites. The websites include, full page or half page ads, banners, picture galleries, video galleries, downloadable images as well as hosting/cam show opportunities. Pinup and the model spilt profits 50/50 and ad revenue 45/55, with 55% going to model.

Pinup Foto 
Pinup also runs a submit a model website called PinupFoto a small branch of Pinup Files. It was launched in 2001 and in 2015 it saw its largest referral year ever seeing over 17,000 model submissions. Pinup Foto also offers services in media creation, digital marking, promotions and modeling management.

Pinup Model of the month

Models 
The following is a list of notable models featured on pinupfiles.com:

 Bianca Beauchamp
 Amber Campisi
 Malene Espensen
 Tessa Fowler
 Jelena Jensen
 Barbara Moore

See also 

 List of pornography companies
 List of glamour models

References

External links 
 

Erotica and pornography websites
Internet properties established in 1998